University of the Americas, locally known as UDLA, is a private Chilean university.

Founded in 1988, UDLA is currently the second largest by enrollment in Chile.

History
UDLA was founded in 1988 and started its academic activities in 1989. Its headquarters are located in the commune of Providencia, in Santiago.

Its first principal was Mario Albornoz, a commercial engineer from the Pontifical Catholic University of Chile and MA in economics from the University of Chicago.

In 1995, UDLA created a branch in Quito, Ecuador.

In 2000, Laureate International Universities, acquired UDLA, allowing students to obtain combined degrees from other institutions in the Laureate group.

Between 2000 and 2007, UDLA became the largest private university in Chile.

Locations 
 Greater Santiago
 Providencia
 Downtown Santiago
 Maipu
 La Florida
 Maipú
 Greater Concepcion
 Chacabuco
 El Boldal
 Viña del Mar
 Los Castaños

References

External links
 
 Laureate International Universities

Universities in Chile
Private universities in Chile
For-profit universities and colleges
Educational institutions established in 1988
Universities in Santiago Metropolitan Region
1988 establishments in Chile